The Death of Ivan the Terrible, is a 1909 Russian short film directed and written by Vasili Goncharov.

Plot 
The film is based on plays by Aleksey Konstantinovich Tolstoy.

Cast
 A. Slavin as Ivan the Terrible
 Yelizaveta Uvarova as Tsarina
 S. Tarasov as Boris Godunov
 Nikolai Vekov as Nagoy, boyar 
 Yakov Protazanov as Garaburda

Production
 Role of Garaburda was the actor debut for Yakov Protazanov.
Actor Slavin, who performed the role of Ivan the Terrible, was too plump for the image of the king, known including asceticism. Its fullness has become one of the most common viewers claims to the film.

References

External links 
 

1909 films
1900s Russian-language films
Russian silent short films
1909 short films
Russian black-and-white films
Films directed by Vasily Goncharov
Films of the Russian Empire
Cultural depictions of Ivan the Terrible